At Home with John Newmark was a Canadian classical music television miniseries which aired on CBC Television in 1954.

Premise
This series featured chamber music by pianist John Newmark, who was a regular personality on CBC Radio. Guests included Noel Brunet, Walter and Otto Joachim, the Masella Brothers, Lucien Robert, Irene Salemka and D'Arcy Shea.

Production
At Home with John Newmark was produced at CBC Montreal studios with a set that resembled Newmark's living room, decorated with Canadian paintings and featuring Newmark's pianos. His Siamese cat made at least one guest appearance during the series.

Scheduling
The half-hour series aired Sundays at 10:30 p.m. (Eastern) from 5 September to 17 October 1954.

References

External links
 

CBC Television original programming
1954 Canadian television series debuts
1954 Canadian television series endings
1950s Canadian music television series
Black-and-white Canadian television shows
Television shows filmed in Montreal